Holiare, until 1948 Gelér (Hungarian pronunciation:) is a village and municipality in the Komárno District in the Nitra Region of south-west Slovakia.

Geography 
The village lies at an altitude of 112 metres and covers an area of 9.885 km².
It has a population of about 415 people.

History 
In the 9th century, the territory of Holiare became part of the Kingdom of Hungary. In historical records the village was first mentioned in 1257.
After the Austro-Hungarian army disintegrated in November 1918, Czechoslovak troops occupied the area, later acknowledged internationally by the Treaty of Trianon. Between 1938 and 1945 Holiare once more  became part of Miklós Horthy's Hungary through the First Vienna Award. From 1945 until the Velvet Divorce, it was part of Czechoslovakia. Since then it has been part of Slovakia.

Demographics 
The village is about 94% Hungarian, 6% Slovak.

Facilities 
The village has a public library, and a  football pitch.

Genealogical resources

The records for genealogical research are available at the state archive "Statny Archiv in Bratislava, Slovakia"

See also
 List of municipalities and towns in Slovakia

References

External links
Surnames of living people in Holiare

Villages and municipalities in the Komárno District
Hungarian communities in Slovakia